José Luis Zertuche Chávez (born 7 May 1973) is a Mexican former professional boxer who competed from 2001 to 2011. He was a former IBA Middleweight Champion. As an amateur, he competed at the 2000 Summer Olympics.

Amateur career
Zertuche had an amateur record of 48-9 and was a two time Light Middleweight Mexican National boxing champion. He was also a member of the 2000 Mexican Olympic team, José would go on to beat Sidy Sandy of Guinea in the first round.

Professional career
In the pros he has a victory over the 2006 winner of the ESPN reality show, The Contender Grady Brewer and some tough losses to both Marcos Reyes and Kelly Pavlik.

References

External links

Boxers from Guanajuato
Sportspeople from León, Guanajuato
Middleweight boxers
Light-middleweight boxers
1987 births
Living people
Mexican male boxers
Olympic boxers of Mexico
Boxers at the 2000 Summer Olympics